Thyris maculata, the spotted thyris, is a species of window-winged moth in the family Thyrididae.

The MONA or Hodges number for Thyris maculata is 6076.

References

Further reading

 

Thyrididae